Lycaste aromatica, common name the sweet scented lycaste, is a species of flowering plant in the genus Lycaste of the family Orchidaceae.

Description 
The flowering period extends from late spring through summer. It is a terrestrial orchid growing on mossy branches (epiphyte).

Distribution 
This plant is native to Central America and it is present in Mexico, Belize, Guatemala, Nicaragua, Honduras and El Salvador.

Habitat 
Lycaste aromatica grows on branches with moss, in damp limestone cliffs and in tropical semi-deciduous forests or warm oak forests along streams.

Synonyms 
Maxillaria aromatica Graham (basionym)
Colax aromaticus (Graham) Spreng.
Lycaste aromatica var. bartleyi 
Lycaste aromatica var. hartleyorum 
Lycaste aromatica var. majus auct 1926
Lycaste aromatica var. retroflexa Oakeley 2001
Lycaste consobrina Rchb.f. 1852
Lycaste suaveolens Summerh. 1931
Maxillaria consobrina Beer ex Schltr.?

Gallery

References 

 Dr. Henry F. Oakeley, 2008 : Lycaste, Ida and Anguloa: The Essential Guide

aromatica
Orchids of Central America
Orchids of Belize
Orchids of El Salvador
Orchids of Guatemala
Orchids of Honduras
Orchids of Mexico
Orchids of Nicaragua
Plants described in 1826